Sanad Bushara Abdel-Nadief Abdalla (born 1947 in Kassala) is a Sudanese footballer who played as a midfielder. He competed in the 1972 Summer Olympics.

References

1947 births
Living people
People from Kassala (state)
1970 African Cup of Nations players
Africa Cup of Nations-winning players
1972 African Cup of Nations players
1976 African Cup of Nations players
Footballers at the 1972 Summer Olympics
Sudanese footballers
Association football midfielders
Olympic footballers of Sudan
Sudan international footballers
Al-Merrikh SC players